A cist ( or ; also kist ;
Examples can be found across Europe and in the Middle East.
A cist may have been associated with other monuments, perhaps under a cairn or long barrow. Several cists are sometimes found close together within the same cairn or barrow. Often ornaments have been found within an excavated cist, indicating the wealth or prominence of the interred individual.

This old word is preserved in the Nordic languages as "" in Swedish and "" in Danish and Norwegian, where it is the word for a funerary coffin.  In English it is related to "cistern".

Regional examples 

Sri Lanka
 Bellanbedipalassa
 Pothana
 Ibbankatuwa Megalithic Stones
 Udaranchamadama
England
 Bellever Forest, Dartmoor
 Hepburn woods, Northumberland

Estonia
 Jõelähtme (Rebala) stone-cist graves, Harju County

Latvia
 Batariņi

Guatemala
 Mundo Perdido, Tikal, Petén Department

Israel
 Tel Kabri (Area A), Upper Galilee

Scotland
 Balblair cist, Beauly, Inverness
 Dunan Aula, Craignish, Argyll and Bute
 Holm Mains Farm, Inverness
 Nether Mill, Kilbirnie, North Ayrshire

See also
 Kistvaen
 Dartmoor kistvaens
 Stone box grave

References

External links

 Pretanic World - Chart of Neolithic, Bronze Age and Celtic Stone Structures

Burial monuments and structures
Archaeology of death